The Brazilian funnel-eared bat (Natalus macrourus) is a bat species found in eastern Brazil and in Paraguay. It roosts in caves, which makes it vulnerable to disturbance of these scarce sites, and in particular, to extermination campaigns against cave-roosting bats carried out in Brazil to combat rabies.

It was formerly considered a subspecies of N. stramineus.

Abiotic factors such as temperature and annual rainfall can affect the distribution of this species.

Physical characteristics include short maxillary toothrow length, deeply concave and deeply notched auricular pinna, small oval nostrils open ventrolaterally, unicolored abdominal fur, bicolored fur with lighter bases on the back and sides.

References

 Libro Rojo de Mamíferos de Paraguay 

Natalus
Bats of Brazil
Endemic fauna of Brazil
Fauna of the Atlantic Forest
Environment of Pará
Environment of Rio Grande do Norte
Environment of São Paulo (state)
Near threatened animals
Near threatened biota of South America
Mammals described in 1856
Taxa named by Paul Gervais
Taxobox binomials not recognized by IUCN